Dalma may refer to the following people
Given name
Dalma Gálfi (born 1998), Hungarian tennis player
Dalma Kovács (born 1985), Romanian pop/jazz singer 
Dalma Mádl (1932–2021), former First Lady of Hungary
Dalma Rushdi Malhas (born 1992), Saudi Arabian equestrian
Dalma Sebestyén (born 1997), Hungarian swimmer
Dalma Ružičić-Benedek (born 1982), Hungarian-born Serbian sprint canoer 

Surname
Rubi Dalma (1906–1994), Italian actress
Sergio Dalma (born 1964), Spanish singer
Tia Dalma, fictional character from the movie Pirates of the Caribbean: Dead Man's Chest